Dimorphococcopsis is a genus of green algae, in the family Dictyosphaeriaceae. , the only species is Dimorphococcopsis fritschii.

References

External links

Scientific references

Scientific databases
 AlgaTerra database
 Index Nominum Genericorum

Trebouxiophyceae
Trebouxiophyceae genera
Monotypic algae genera